Ashok Menon (born on 15 August 1959) was a judge of Kerala High Court. The High Court of Kerala is the highest court in the Indian state of Kerala and in the Union Territory of Lakshadweep. The High Court of Kerala is headquartered at Ernakulam, Kochi.

Early life
Ashok completed his schooling from Kendriya Vidyalaya, graduated  from  St. Thomas College, Thrissur and obtained a law degree from Government Law College, Kozhikode.

Career
Ashok started practicing as a lawyer in Thrissur and Wadakkancherry Courts in 1981. He started serving as Munsiff-Magistrate in 1988. Thereafter promoted as Sub Judge in 1995 and as District Judge in 2002. He was appointed as Registrar, Supreme Court of India in 2009 and continued to be as Registrar, Competition Appellate Tribunal, New Delhi from 2010 to 2013. Thereafter served as Principal District Judge, Kollam from 2013 to 2015. He was appointed as Registrar General, High Court of Kerala in 2015. on 30 November 2017 he was elevated as an additional judge of High Court of Kerala and became permanent judge of High Court of Kerala on 29 August 2019.

References

External links
 High Court of Kerala

Living people
Judges of the Kerala High Court
21st-century Indian judges
1959 births